Glenmona Bridge is a riveted wrought iron lattice-girder deck-truss road bridge on the old route between the Ararat and central goldfields over the Bet Bet Creek at Bung Bong, Victoria.

History
The bridge was built in 1871 to replace an 1857 timber bridge that was destroyed in the statewide floods of 1870. Those super-floods devastated much of the state's road network, and resulted in a redesign of many river and creek crossings, to raise the roads above flood levels not seen before.

The continuous trusses are 46.6 metres long and the piers are quite tall at 10.1 metres high. It is the third-oldest of its type in Victoria. Its location is directly south of the new bridge over the Bet Bet on the Pyrenees Highway.

The timber deck and handrails were destroyed in a bushfire on 14 January 1985.

Similar bridge 
Whereas the huge lattice truss girders of the Redesdale Bridge in Redesdale, Victoria, had been imported from England in 1859, colonial engineering works had, in the meantime, developed to service reef and deep lead mining, and were quite capable of supplying such products for the Glenmona bridge, by 1870.

Significance
The bridge is registered on the Victorian Heritage Council database and with the National Trust of Australia. and the Shire of Pyrenees heritage overlay.

The Pyrenees Shire Council has documented the Glenmona Park homestead on Glenmona Road, Bung Bong, at the Bet Bet Creek, in the Avoca Heritage Study: 1864 - 1994 - Volume 3.

See also
 Bung Bong, Victoria
 Pyrenees Highway, Victoria
 Redesdale Bridge

References

External links
  Avoca and District Historical Society
  Prior website of the Avoca and District Historical Society
  From Bung Bong to Lapstone Hill
  Colin O'Connor, Spanning Two Centuries, Historic Bridges of Australia. University of Queensland Press, 1985. p. 103

1859 establishments in Australia
Road bridges in Victoria (Australia)
Bridges completed in 1859
Bridges completed in 1871
Victorian Heritage Register
Truss bridges in Australia